The Teaquahan River, formerly Teaquahan Creek, is a river in the Pacific Ranges of the Coast Mountains, flowing into the head of Bute Inlet at Waddington Harbour, immediately east of the mouth of the Homathko River.

See also
List of British Columbia rivers
Homathko Estuary Provincial Park

References

Rivers of the Central Coast of British Columbia
Rivers of the Pacific Ranges